Philomena, Countess of Paris (born Maria Philomena Magdalena Juliana Johanna de Tornos y Steinhart; 19 June 1977) is an aristocrat of Hispanic-Austrian descent. She is the wife of Jean, Count of Paris, Orléanist claimant to the throne of France and head of the House of Orléans.

Early life and ancestry 

Philomena is the daughter of Alfonso de Tornos y Zubiría (b. Getxo, 13 October 1937), of Basque ancestry, and his wife (married Vienna, 18 September 1976) Maria Antonia Anna Zdenka, Edle von Steinhart (b. 1944), of Austro-Hungarian noble ancestry. 
Philomena has a sister named Maria Magdalena (1980) and a brother, David (1982). Her paternal grandparents are Juan de Tornos y Espelíus (former head of the personal secretariat of Infante Juan, Count of Barcelona, grandfather of the current King of Spain) and Doña María del Carmen Zubiría y Calbetón, daughter of Don Luis de Zubiria y Urizar, 2nd Marquis de Yanduri. Her maternal grandparents were Dr. Ferdinand, Edler von Steinhart (1910–1998) and his wife (married September 1939) Gabriele Felicitas Murad von Werner (1913–1994), paternal granddaughter of Murad Effendi, Ottoman diplomat who was born as Franz Xaver Karl Georg Arthur von Werner.

Life and education

She spent part of her youth in the Auvergne and studied at the Lycée Maritime in Ciboure. Philomena, her husband Jean and their children lived at their family estate in Dreux, France, but in 2020 they moved to live in Montréal de l'Aude.

Marriage and children 

Philomena married Prince Jean, Duke of Vendôme in a civil service on 19 March 2009 in Paris, conducted by Mayor Rachida Dati. The religious wedding was held on 2 May 2009 at the Cathédrale Notre-Dame at Senlis, with a reception at the Château de Chantilly. The bride wore a gown by Christian Lacroix and a jacket embroidered by Maison Lesage.

The couple have five children:
 Prince Gaston Louis Antoine Marie d'Orléans (born 19 November 2009 in Paris), became Dauphin of France succeeding his father on 21 January 2019;
 Princess Antoinette Léopoldine Jeanne Marie d'Orléans (born 28 January 2012 in Vienna);
 Princess Louise-Marguerite Éléonore Marie d'Orléans (born 30 July 2014 in Poissy);
 Prince Joseph Gabriel David Marie d'Orléans (born 2 June 2016 in Dreux);
 Princess Jacinthe Élisabeth-Charlotte Marie d’Orléans (born 9 October 2018 in Dreux).

Dynastic honours
  Portuguese Royal Family: Dame Grand Cross of the Royal Order of Saint Isabel (27 October 2012, installed 6 November 2012)
  Two Sicilian Royal Family: Bailiff Dame Grand Cross of Justice of the Sacred Military Constantinian Order of Saint George (19 March 2019, installed 13 May 2019)

See also 
Orléanist

References

Bibliography

External links 
 Official website of Prince Jean

|-

1977 births
House of Orléans
Countesses of Paris
Dames of the Order of Saint Isabel
Living people